The EXL 100 is a computer released in 1984 by the French brand Exelvision, based on the TMS 7020 microprocessor from Texas Instruments. This was an uncommon design choice (at the time almost all home computers either used 6502 or Z80 microprocessors) but justified by the fact that the engineering team behind the machine (Jacques Palpacuer, Victor Zebrouck and Christian Petiot) came from Texas instruments.
It was part of the government Computing for All plan and 9000 units were used in schools.

The design is unusual compared with similar machines of the time, as it had a separate central processing unit. Two keyboards are available: one with rubber keys and another with a more standard touch. Keyboard and joystick were not connected to the central unit by a cable but by infrared link, and are battery powered. Many extensions were available: modem, floppy disk drive and a 16 KB CMOS RAM powered by an integrated lithium battery.
Its TMS 5220 sound processor was capable of French speech synthesis, another unusual feature.

The machine came with a BASIC version on cartridge named ExelBasic.

Specifications
Release price: 3,190 French Francs
 CPU: TMS 7020 at 4.9 Mhz
 Graphics chip: TMS 3556 (40 x 25 character text mode, 320 x 250 pixel graphics mode, 8 colors)
 Sound: TMS 5220 (with speech synthesis in French)
 Storage: cartridge port, cassettes, optional floppy disk drive
 Memory: 34KB RAM (2KB RAM + 32KB Shared VRAM), 4 to 32KB ROM
Variants: A version with an integrated V23 modem named Exeltel was released in 1986

References

Lists of computer hardware
Computer companies of France